"The Trooper" is a song by the English heavy metal band Iron Maiden. It was released as the second single on 20 June 1983 from the band's fourth studio album, Piece of Mind (1983). It was one of only a few songs to get much radio airplay in the United States, thus peaking at No. 28 on the US Mainstream Rock charts. It also achieved success in the United Kingdom, peaking at No. 12 in the UK Singles Charts as well as gaining a much better reception than the band's previous single, "Flight of Icarus".

A live version of the song, from Death on the Road, was issued in 2005.

Overview

Written by bassist and founding-member Steve Harris, the song is based on the Charge of the Light Brigade at the Battle of Balaclava 1854, which took place during the Crimean War, and inspired by Lord Tennyson's 1854 poem of the same name. The track has been the subject of much praise since its release, with AllMusic describing it as "an all-time genre classic that boasts guitarists Dave Murray and Adrian Smith's most memorable harmonized lead riff, plus that trademark galloping rhythm," while Mick Wall comments that it is the song "which most Maiden fans from those days still recall first when you mention the Piece of Mind album." Despite the popularity of the song, it was the single's B-Side, a cover of Jethro Tull's "Cross-Eyed Mary", which managed to gain a substantial amount of airplay on US radio, becoming one of the band's few tracks, along with previous single "Flight of Icarus", to do so.

The single's accompanying music video included clips of a cavalry battle from the 1936 film The Charge of the Light Brigade, starring Errol Flynn and Olivia de Havilland, which the BBC refused to play unedited, deeming the footage too violent. The band's manager, Rod Smallwood, has since criticised the decision, stating, "Anyone would think we'd killed the horses ourselves instead of using an old Errol Flynn movie." In 2003, Iron Maiden released a Camp Chaos version for the song. The music video shows the never-before-seen clips of the band playing the song as well as the animated battle between Eddie and politicians Al Gore and George W. Bush to which Eddie ended the conflict in the video by killing both Bush, Gore and their team. The updated version came in 2008, this time, the two US politicians were replaced by Eddie's yellow skeleton allies and their red enemy skeletons.

A regular fixture in the band's concerts, vocalist Bruce Dickinson has always waved a Union Flag during live performances and, more recently, has begun wearing an authentic red coat uniform which would have been worn during the battle on which the song was based. During a performance in Dublin in 2003, Dickinson's flag-waving reportedly received a large amount of booing from the Irish audience.

While the band were receiving criticism from Sharon Osbourne in 2005, at the time justifying her attack on the band at the 2005 Ozzfest, she accused Iron Maiden of disrespecting American troops, then fighting alongside the British in Iraq, for waving a Union Flag in the US, although Classic Rock magazine supported the band by pointing out that the song's subject bore no relation to the military activity then taking place in the Middle East.

On 15 August 2005, a live version of the song was released from the then upcoming live album, Death on the Road.

On 24 April 2016, during Iron Maiden's performance in Beijing (their first in China), Dickinson did not bring out a flag while performing "The Trooper" as part of the request from the Chinese government to allow Iron Maiden to perform in the country. The flag was also omitted for a concert in Shanghai two days later.

In popular culture
The song has appeared in several Iron Maiden tribute albums, including A Call To Irons: A Tribute To Iron Maiden, Numbers from the Beast, A Tribute to the Beast and Maiden Heaven: A Tribute to Iron Maiden, as well as on records by tribute bands such as Maiden uniteD (on 2010's Mind the Acoustic Pieces) and The Iron Maidens (on their 2006 self-titled debut album). In addition, the song has been released by Sentenced on The Trooper EP (1994), Rage on End of All Days (1996), Hellsongs on Hymns in the Key of 666 (2008), Thumper on the Metalliska compilation, Highland Glory as a bonus track on Forever Endeavour (2005), Radio Cult on Grooves From The Grave (2008), Stryper on The Covering, Iced Earth on the "tour edition" of their 2011 album, Dystopia, and 2Cellos on their 2015 album, Celloverse.

On top of this, the track has also been included in the Guitar Hero 2, Carmageddon 2, Guitar Hero: Smash Hits and Rock Band video games, is mentioned in the novel World War Z by Max Brooks and is used as the opening theme for the documentary series Metal Evolution.

Iron Maiden created a beer called "Trooper", named after the song.

Northern Ireland
During the course of the Troubles in Northern Ireland the image of Eddie, as he appears on the sleeve of "The Trooper", became an unofficial mascot of the Ulster Freedom Fighters loyalist paramilitary group and was the main figure on a number of the group's murals. The loyalist representation frequently carried a tattered flag with the emblem of the Ulster Defence Association rather than the Union Flag as on the Iron Maiden sleeve.

Track listings
7" & 12" Single

2005 Enhanced CD

2005 7" Blue Vinyl

2005 12" Picture Disc

Personnel
Production credits are adapted from the 7-inch vinyl cover.

Iron Maiden
Bruce Dickinson – lead vocals
Dave Murray – guitar
Adrian Smith – guitar
Steve Harris – bass guitar
Nicko McBrain – drums

Production
Martin Birch – producer, engineer
Derek Riggs – cover illustration

Charts

Notes

Certifications

References

1983 singles
1983 songs
2005 singles
Crimean War fiction
Iron Maiden songs
Number-one singles in Spain
Songs about the military
Songs written by Steve Harris (musician)
Adaptations of works by Alfred, Lord Tennyson